Since its release in 2016, multiple real-life events and gatherings based on the augmented reality (AR) mobile game Pokémon Go have been held by its developer Niantic Labs outside of unofficial player gatherings. Typically, the events involve increased in-game rewards for participating players and are often held in cooperation with local organizations or governments.

The common repeating events are the Pokémon Go Fest held annually, the Pokémon Go Safari Zone which has been held in multiple countries, and the monthly "Community Day" events. Player counts for the larger events range from thousands up to two million players in one event. Due to large concentrations of players all using their mobile phones in such events, the large gatherings have resulted in incidents and network disruptions, which have resulted in a lawsuit against Niantic.

Background

Pokémon Go

Pokémon Go (or Pokémon GO) is an augmented reality mobile game developed by Niantic Labs, based on the Pokémon franchise of Game Freak which began to release in July 2016. The game centers around catching various Pokémon creatures by navigating the in-game map based on the player's actual location and nearby landmarks. Shortly after its release, the game went viral, breaking multiple records and being installed on millions of devices within weeks of its initial release. With the game's massive initial player base, landmarks would gather crowds of players taking advantage of the "Pokéstops" which provide player with items, to the point where certain landmarks such as the United States Holocaust Memorial Museum and the Arlington National Cemetery explicitly requested players to not play the game within the grounds. On the other hand, the traffic generated by the game was capitalized on by some local businesses.

During the first weeks after the game's release, multiple events and gatherings organized by the players happened across the world. Examples include a single gathering in Sydney days after the game's launch which attracted over 2,000 players, and a Facebook-based bar crawl in San Francisco for the game collected thousands of responses and a significant number of attendees. Another player gathering at Chicago's Millennium Park gathered around 5,000 players. A zoo in Bristol, which held a Go event, received more attendance than its capacity and had to turn away players.

Several months after release, the player count for the game declined, losing some one-third of its peak of 45 million active users by mid-August 2016. Niantic held the first in-game event – where different Pokémon are encountered in the game and players receive increased rewards – on Halloween of 2016, and the revenue generated by the game spiked during the period. Go had several more in-game events that year, including on Thanksgiving Day and Christmas. In one November 2016 event, Niantic increased the spawn rate of the otherwise rare Pokémon Lapras in areas affected by the 2011 Tōhoku earthquake and tsunami, intended to help recover tourism in the area.

Shortly after Go'''s release, during an interview with Recode, Niantic CEO John Hanke stated that Niantic intended to hold official events, due to their experience with their previous game Ingress. He stated that the intent of the events for Go would be to have "people coming together, having an event that moves you through an interesting part of the city so it's part walking tour, part competition, and then having a big get-together at the end where we're announcing winners [and] leaderboards." He also added that the lack of events in the early stages of the game was to ensure that Niantic could handle the expected large crowds in such events.

Ingress events

Prior to the release of Go, Niantic had developed and released a similar AR game called Ingress. A component of Ingress is a series of real-life events held directly by Niantic across multiple cities. Its first post-beta event series, held in 2013, spanned over 9 weeks and involved 39 cities worldwide. The Pokémon Company (TPC) CEO Tsunekazu Ishihara was also an Ingress player, which according to Hanke eased cooperation between Niantic and TPC for Go.

One type of Ingress events is known as "Anomalies", where gathered players in a specific location attempt to control the landmarks to score points for their factions, with clear victory objectives. Anomalies can have attendances of upwards of 1,000 players, and Hanke noted in the 2016 Recode interview that an event in Japan gathered over 10,000. Additionally, Ingress also holds monthly "First Saturday" events and #NL1331 meetups (involving a mobile van).

Pokémon Go Fest
2017

In June 2017, Niantic announced a new "Pokémon Go Fest" event, which was held in Chicago's Grant Park on 22 July 2017 as the game's first official real-life event. Tickets to the event, priced at US$20, were sold out within fifteen minutes of its release for sale, despite the details of the event not having been revealed then. Scalpers were reported to have attempted to resell the tickets through resellers for inflated prices. Later, it was revealed that players worldwide and players at Grant Park would contribute towards a catching target, which would unlock rewards.

On the date of the event itself, The Chicago Tribune estimated that 20,000 players attended, some having traveled across the United States or even from abroad. During the event itself, however, mobile networks in the park overloaded, resulting in the attendees being nearly unable to play the game. Niantic acknowledged the issue by around 2 p.m., and its CEO Hanke was booed when speaking on stage in front of the players. In an attempt to alleviate the network pressure,  Niantic extended the in-game event area to two miles outside of Grant Park, and continued the event throughout the weekend. The event in Grant Park was ended on 5 p.m. local time, two hours before it was scheduled. Multiple media outlets called the event a "disaster". A spokesperson from Niantic remarked that the company's staff were "horrified" with the outcome of the event.

Immediately after the event, Niantic refunded the tickets of the attendees, in addition to giving their accounts US$100 worth of in-game currency and the legendary Pokémon Lugia, meant to have been released during the event. Niantic released a blog post by Hanke the following day, blaming both technical issues with the game – which was resolved according to the post – and network oversaturation due to insufficient availability of mobile cell sites. Also according to the blog post, 7.7 million Pokémon were captured by players in Downtown Chicago during the ensuing weekend. In a 2018 interview with The Guardian, Hanke remarked that "the first six hours of [Pokémon Go Fest] were among the most challenging of my professional life."

Later on, a Go Fest attendee Jonathan Norton filed a class action lawsuit to the Circuit Court of Cook County against Niantic. The lawsuit was settled after Niantic agreed to pay US$1.575 million to compensate for non-ticket fees such as accommodation and transportation.

2018
Despite the outcome of the 2017 Go Fest, Niantic announced a second Go Fest to be held again in Chicago, at Lincoln Park, on 7 May 2018. Unlike the previous Fest, the event was held across two days – 14 and 15 July. The area allocated for the event was larger, with attendees being limited to one of the two days, and additional temporary cellular network facilities were provided by major providers. Like in 2017, tickets for the event sold out rapidly, with tickets running out on the official website within half an hour and scalpers reselling the tickets for increased prices.

During the event, Lincoln Park was decorated with props resembling various biomes which could be found in the game. As part of the event, Pokémon which are normally rare or only found in other parts of the world spawned in the area. Attendees were also given a chance to complete "Research Quests" in-game in order to encounter the Mythical Pokémon Celebi. According to Niantic, 21,000 people attended the event in Lincoln Park with an additional 180,000 players in Chicago. The event was seen as largely successful, with relatively few technical difficulties in contrast to the 2017 event.

2019
A third Go Fest event was announced on 4 April 2019. The 2019 event, unlike the preceding ones, were to be held in three separate cities – Chicago (Grant Park, held between 13–16 June), Dortmund (Westfalenpark, held between 4–7 July) and Yokohama (Yamashita Park, Rinko Park and Akarenga Park, held between 6–12 August). In the lead-up to the events, Niantic held a "Pokémon Go Snapshot Challenge", centered around the game's augmented reality camera feature, with the contest's main prizes being trips to the Go Fest events. Tickets for the Chicago event were distributed through a random drawing which followed in-game registration.

Niantic reported around 60,000 attendees to the Chicago event. The reported player count in Dortmund was 85,000 in the Westfalenpark across the four days, and 150,000 players participated in Yokohama.

2020–2022
In 2020, due to the COVID-19 pandemic which limited the capacity for in-person gatherings, Niantic opted for a fully online Go Fest, holding the event worldwide and enabling players to participate in the event at home. It was held on 25–26 July 2020.

The 2021 Go Fest was held on 17–18 July, with a lower ticket price of $5. With the pandemic's impact having lessened in parts of the world, the 2021 Go Fest involved at-home events still, but also a number of real-life gatherings in 21 cities across the United States and Europe. Unlike events in 2017–2019, which saw Niantic set up many Pokémon themed builds across the parks, the 2021 events were described as having "a lighter touch", with the locations intended to be more spread out. Each of the 21 locations were still manned by Niantic staff. A special "raid egg" display was set up at Maggie Daley Park in Chicago, in reference to the first Go Fest held in the city.

The global part of the 2022 Go fest was held 4–5 June with a finale event 27 August. A pink flower around the logo hinted that the mythical Pokémon Shaymin would make its Pokémon Go debut. It was officially confirmed later. There were also in-person events in three cities in different weekends: 1–3 July in Berlin, 22–24 July in Seattle, and 5–7 August in Sapporo.

Pokémon Go Safari Zone
On 12 July 2017, Niantic announced "Safari Zone" events across several cities in Europe at shopping centers operated by Unibail-Rodamco, held in August and September 2017. The events, where otherwise region-limited Pokémon could be found among others, required registration and had a player limit – for example, the event in Amsterdam was limited to 2,000 players, though unregistered players would still be able to play with increased rewards within the city. However, due to the failure of the 2017 Go Fest event, Niantic delayed some of the Safari Zone events to fall that year.

Later in 2017, another Safari Zone event was held in Tottori Prefecture, Japan, at the Tottori Sand Dunes between 24 and 26 November. According to the local government, 89,000 people attended the event which generated around US$16 million in travel and tourism revenue. In the leadup to the event, Niantic brought several influencers in a tour around Japan as a campaign which was named Pokémon Go Travel.

The Summer 2018 iteration of the Safari Zone – announced in conjunction with the 2018 Go Fest as part of a "Summer Tour" – involved a Safari Zone event in Dortmund's Westfalenpark on 30 June and 1 July, and another event in Yokosuka, Japan on 29 August – 2 September. The Dortmund event attracted some 170,000 players across the city, thrice the expected amount, with some players reporting network issues during the 2-day event.

Yokosuka's 2018 Safari Zone event, held in three parks, took up large portions of the city, with speakers playing Go's in-game music and businesses handing out Pokémon merchandise. Niantic reported that 65,000 players went to one of the three parks and that 200,000 users played in Yokosuka during the event.

A Safari Zone event was held in Chiayi County of Taiwan between 26 February and 3 March 2018, during the Chiayi Lantern Festival. In total, around 200,000 players went to Chiayi – which had a population of around 500,000 – for the event. Between 1 and 5 November 2018, another Safari Zone event was held in Tainan, Taiwan. While initially expected to have 200,000 attendees, the event ended up gathering 560,000 participants, with 80,000 during the last day (a Monday) alone. Around one-tenth of the figure were players from overseas, mainly from Japan and Hong Kong. The event, which generated an estimated NT$ 1.5 billion for the local economy, was the result of a cooperation between Niantic and the local government, though the former did not receive royalties.

The first Safari Zone event of 2019 was held in Porto Alegre, Brazil on 25 January. 130,000 players registered to join the event, though only 25,000 were granted tickets. The event was largely conducted alongside the banks of the Guaíba River. Niantic later also announced another Safari Zone, held between 18 and 22 April at Sentosa, Singapore. 125,000 tickets were issued, 20 percent of those to non-Singaporeans. After the event concluded, Niantic reported an attendance of 95,000 players. Between 20 and 22 September 2019, another Safari Zone event was held in Montreal, Canada, with an attendance of approximately 45,000 players. Tickets for the event were sold out in four hours. Another Taiwanese Safari Zone, held in New Taipei City between 3 and 6 October 2019, saw 100,000 players in the first day and 150,000 in the second, with the city's tourism and travel department estimating a NT$100 million profit generated by the event for local businesses, with around 40 percent of the attendees coming from outside Taiwan.

For 2020, Safari Zone events were scheduled to be held in St. Louis (27–29 March), Liverpool (17–19 April), and Philadelphia (8–10 May). However, all three Safari Zone events were postponed due to the ongoing coronavirus pandemic, with ticketholders receiving the Safari Zone experience in their own locales during the originally scheduled dates. The new dates were 15–17 October 2021 for Liverpool, 29–31 October for Philadelphia, and 12–14 November for St. Louis. 20,000 players attended the in-person event at Sefton Park, in Liverpool, with thousands also attending the events at Tower Grove Park, St. Louis and Fairmount Park, Philadelphia.

In 2022 there were scheduled Safari Zone events in Seville, Spain 13–15 May at Alamillo Park, in Goyang, South Korea 23–25 September at Ilsan Lake Park, in Taipei, Taiwan 21–23 October at Daan Forest Park, and in Singapore 18–20 November in Gardens by the Bay.

Community Days
Community Days are monthly worldwide in-game events where certain Pokémon species spawn in large amounts. An evolution of the featured Pokémon can learn an exclusive event move which is generally stronger than its normal moves. There are also bonuses like more rewards or time for certain activities. Community Days are intended to draw players together especially in major cities, and the events drew crowds in hotspots such as Seattle's Green Lake and Brighton and Hove's Hove Park.

The first Community Day was "Pikachu day" on 20 January 2018. In January 2022, Niantic introduced Community Day Classic, a second Community Day bringing back a previously featured Pokémon and the three hour event duration seen pre-pandemic, but with the bonus benefits introduced because of it. The April Day Community Day also reverted to a 3-hour total duration.

As of Togetic on 15 April 2023, 57 Pokémon have been featured (six of them twice): Abra, Bagon, Beldum, Bulbasaur (2), Charmander (2), Chespin, Chikorita, Chimchar, Cyndaquil, Deino, Dratini (2), Duskull, Eevee (2), Electabuzz, Fletchling, Gastly, Geodude, Gible, Hoppip, Larvitar (2), Litwick, Machop, Magikarp, Magmar, Mareep, Mudkip (2), Noibat, Oshawott, Pikachu, Piplup, Porygon, Ralts, Rhyhorn, Roggenrola, Roselia, Sandshrew, Seedot, Shinx, Slakoth, Slowpoke, Snivy, Spheal, Squirtle, Starly, Stufful, Swablu, Swinub, Teddiursa, Tepig, Togetic, Torchic, Totodile, Trapinch, Treecko, Turtwig, Weedle, Zigzagoon.

Other events

Outside of the events mentioned above, Niantic has held multiple one-off events, official or in cooperation with other organizations. On 7 May 2017, the first real-life event was held in Charlotte, North Carolina. The first such official Go event in Europe was held in Chester, United Kingdom, on 22–23 July 2017 during the annual Chester Heritage Festival in partnership with local non-profit Big Heritage. It was estimated that during the two days, between 16 and 18 thousand players visited the city.

Between 9 and 15 August 2017, during the Pikachu Outbreak event held by TPC, Niantic held Pokémon Go Park events in two parks within the city of Yokohama, Japan. On 14 August, during the aforementioned event, a Pokémon Go Stadium event was held at Yokohama Stadium in which thousands of players attempted to catch Mewtwo. The event was livestreamed. In total, during the seven days of the event 2 million players participated in Yokohama, with the Pikachu Outbreak event overall recording 3 million participants including the Go players. Due to the disruption to the city's traffic caused by the large numbers of attendees, Yokohama declined to host a Go event the following year.

In partnership with the Knight Foundation, an event was held in Akron, Ohio on 26–27 August 2017. Niantic also partnered with the Viva Calle San Jose event on 17 September 2017, and a second iteration of the partnership was held on 23 September 2018. Go also held scavenger hunts in the Philadelphia's 2017 Philly Free Streets and in Los Angeles in partnership with CicLAvia on 10 December 2017.

Held alongside the annual Pokémon Festa, between 4 and 12 November 2017 Go'' had an event held across South Korea. The event was repeated the following year, centered around Lotte Mall of Seoul, between 21 and 23 September 2018.

On Earth Day of April 2018, an "Earth Day Cleanup" event was launched, which rewarded players globally if sufficient players signed up to join cleanup events across 12 countries. Niantic reported over 4,200 players signing up with 6,600 kg of trash collected across 19 countries.

Notes

References

External links
 Pokémon GO Events

Go Live Events
Video game events